I'll Find a Way is a 1977 Canadian short documentary film directed by Beverly Shaffer about nine-year-old Nadia DeFranco, who has spina bifida. Produced by Studio D, the women's unit of the National Film Board of Canada, the film won an Oscar in 1978 for Best Live Action Short Film.

Just a Wedding
In 1999, Shaffer completed Just a Wedding, a sequel to I'll Find a Way, revisiting DeFranco as she prepares to get married.

References

External links

Watch I'll Find a Way at NFB.ca

1977 films
1977 documentary films
Canadian independent films
Canadian short documentary films
Documentary films about children with disability
English-language Canadian films
Films directed by Beverly Shaffer
Live Action Short Film Academy Award winners
National Film Board of Canada documentaries
National Film Board of Canada short films
1970s English-language films
1970s Canadian films